Ing Friedrich (Fritz) Görnnert (18 March 1907 – 1 May 1984) was Ministerial Counsellor (personal assistant) to Hermann Göring from January 1937 until the capture of Göring in 1945. He had previously been assistant to Professor Töpfer, who held the chair of aircraft construction at Karlsruhe University.

Early life
Görnnert was born in Karlsruhe in 1907, where he also died. He studied mathematics and sciences at the University Of Heidelberg, 1927 to 1928, and machine-construction and aircraft-construction at the Technical College of Karlsruhe from 1928 to 1933.

Nazi Party
He joined the Nazi Party in 1931 as a student member, number 411,588. He joined the SA (Sturmabteilung) in 1933 and the Luftwaffe in 1940. He became assistant to Göring in 1937. He remained in that position until Göring was captured at the end of the Second World War in 1945. He was detained by the Allies until 1947 and was not charged with war crimes.

References

External links
https://web.archive.org/web/20091029024654/http://geocities.com/~orion47/WEHRMACHT/LUFTWAFFE/Beamten/GOERNNERT_FRIEDRICH.html
https://web.archive.org/web/20141223005706/http://www.hermann-historica.de/auktion/hhm66.pl?f=NR_LOT&c=7363&t=temartic_R_GB&db=kat66_r.txt

1907 births
Hermann Göring
Nazi Party members
1984 deaths
Engineers from Karlsruhe
Sturmabteilung personnel
Luftwaffe personnel of World War II